Ganj Darreh may refer to:

Ganj Dareh, an archaeological site in Kermanshah Province, Iran
Ganj Darreh-ye Olya, a village in Lorestan Province, Iran
Ganj Darreh-ye Sofla, a village in Lorestan Province, Iran